The 1988–89 Colorado State Rams men's basketball team represented Colorado State University as a member of the Western Athletic Conference during the 1988–89 college basketball season. The team was led by head coach Boyd Grant. The Rams finished 23–10 and won the WAC regular season title with a 12–4 conference record. After falling to UTEP in the finals of the WAC tournament, the team received an at-large bid to the NCAA tournament as the No. 10 seed in the Midwest region. After defeating Florida in the opening round, the Rams were beaten by No. 2 seed Syracuse in the second round.

Roster

Schedule and results

|-
!colspan=9 style=| Regular season

|-
!colspan=9 style=| WAC tournament

|-
!colspan=9 style=| NCAA tournament

Rankings

NBA draft

References

Colorado State Rams men's basketball seasons
Colorado State
Colorado State
Colorado State Rams
Colorado State Rams